The 54th season of the Campeonato Gaúcho kicked off on March 9, 1974, and ended on December 15, 1974. Sixteen teams participated. Internacional won their 22nd title.

Participating teams

System 
The championship would have three stages.:

 Preliminary phase: The twelve best clubs in the Copa Governador do Estado of the previous year and another two teams qualified from the Copa Cícero Soares would play in a single round-robin format against each other. the eight best teams would qualify to the Decagonal. the six bottom teams would qualify to the second phase of the Copa Governador do Estado.
 Decagonal: The remaining eight teams, now joined by Grêmio and Internacional, would play each other in a double round-robin format.
 Finals: The winners of the two rounds of the Decagonal qualified to this stage. If the same team won both stages, it would win the title automatically.

Championship

Preliminary phase

Decagonal

First round

Second round

Final standings

Third place playoffs

Copa Governador do Estado

System 
The cup would have two stages: 

 First phase: Eighteen teams would be divided into three groups of six teams. Each team would play twice against the teams of its own group. The four best teams in each group qualified to the Second phase.
 Second phase: The twelve remaining teams joined the six teams that had been eliminated in the Preliminary phase of the Campeonato Gaúcho and played each other in a single round-robin format. The 15 best teams would qualify to the 1975 Campeonato Gaúcho.

First phase

Group A

Group B

Group C

Second phase

References 

Campeonato Gaúcho seasons
Gaúcho